Alexander Henry may refer to:
Alexander Henry the elder (1739–1834), fur trader and entrepreneur
 Alexander Henry the younger (died 1814), who was also a fur-trader, and the nephew of the above  
Alexander Henry (gunsmith), Scottish gunsmith
Alexander Henry (Philadelphia), U.S. politician 
Alex Henry, Canadian ice hockey player
CCGS Alexander Henry, Canadian museum ship, icebreaker
Alexander Henry (MP), British Member of Parliament for South Lancashire